The 1902–03 Columbia men's ice hockey season was the 7th season of play for the program.

Season
The team did not have a head coach but Charles Dana served as team manager.

Note: Columbia University adopted the Lion as its mascot in 1910.

Roster

Standings

Schedule and Results

|-
!colspan=12 style=";" | Regular Season

† Because Princeton's team was disbanded they were forced to forfeit the overtime session to be played after the 18th of February. As a result Columbia finished in a tie with Yale for 2nd place in the conference, necessitating the game on February 24.

References

Columbia Lions men's ice hockey seasons
Columbia
Columbia
Columbia
Columbia